Hryhoriy Savych Chorny, died 1630, was a Hetman of the Dnieper Cossacks from 1628 to 1630 who represented the registered Cossacks while the larger bulk of unregistered ones elected Taras Fedorovych (Triasylo) as their popular leader.

In 1628 Chorny along with Mykhailo Doroshenko took part in the Crimean campaign against the Crimean Tatars. Following Doroshenko's death both Fedorovych and Chorny laid their claim to Hetmanship while only the latter's claim was recognized by the Polish Crown despite Fedorovych's unquestionably larger popular support.

As a Hetman, Chorny conducted pro-Polish policies, particularly aimed at suppression and control of the rank and file of the unregistered Cossacks.

During the popular Fedorovych Uprising of unregistered Cossacks and peasants Chorny was captured by the rebels and had to stand trial before a Cossack military tribunal. He was found guilty and sentenced to death for the support of the Polish policies and the Union of Brest, a subtle attempt of Catholicization of unwilling traditionally Orthodox Ukrainians.  Chorny was beheaded in Borovytsi, currently a village in Chyhyrynskyi Raion (district) of Cherkasy Oblast (province).

References
Ihor Pidkova (editor), Roman Shust (editor), "Dovidnyk z istorii Ukrainy", 3 Volumes, "(t. 3), Kiev, 1993-1999,  (t. 1),  (t. 2),  (t. 3). Article: Hryhoriy Chorny
Kubiyovych, Volodymyr, Kuzelia, Zenon. Енциклопедія українознавства (Encyclopedia of Ukrainian studies), 3 volumes (1994). Article: "Hryhoriy Chorny". Kiev. 
Mykhailo Hrushevsky,  edited by O. J. Frederiksen. A History of Ukraine.  New Haven: Yale University Press: 1941.

Hetmans of the Zaporozhian Cossacks
1630 deaths
Year of birth unknown
Executed Ukrainian people
17th-century executions
Catholicisation